Michel Sainte-Marie (18 August 1938 – 27 February 2019) was a member of the National Assembly of France.  He represented the Gironde department,  and was a member of the Socialist, radical, citizen and miscellaneous left (SRC) party.

Biography 
Before entering politics, Sainte-Marie was a high school teacher of mathematics, physics and chemistry.

From 1974 to 2014 he was mayor of Mérignac, a commune in the Gironde. Concurrently, from 1977 to 1983 he was president of Bordeaux Métropole, a grouping of communes centred on the city of Bordeaux.

From 1973 to 2012, he was a member of the National Assembly for Gironde's 6th constituency, sitting as a member of the SRC group.

References

1938 births
2019 deaths
People from Bayonne
Politicians from Nouvelle-Aquitaine
Socialist Party (France) politicians
Deputies of the 5th National Assembly of the French Fifth Republic
Deputies of the 6th National Assembly of the French Fifth Republic
Deputies of the 7th National Assembly of the French Fifth Republic
Deputies of the 8th National Assembly of the French Fifth Republic
Deputies of the 9th National Assembly of the French Fifth Republic
Deputies of the 11th National Assembly of the French Fifth Republic
Deputies of the 12th National Assembly of the French Fifth Republic
Deputies of the 13th National Assembly of the French Fifth Republic